Ovid S. Crohmălniceanu (born Moise Cahn or Cohn; 16 August 1921, in Galați, Romania – 27 April or 28 April 2000, in Berlin, Germany) was a Romanian literary critic and science fiction writer.

Biography
After graduating from high school in his home town, he began to study, in 1939, at the Politehnica University of Bucharest, but had to interrupt his studies in 1940. In 1944, he resumed his studies, and got a diploma in construction engineering in 1947.

After World War II, he had a series of jobs in the magazines (Contemporanul, Viața Românească, Gazeta literară) and in a publishing house (Editura Didactică și Pedagogică) before beginning to work as an academic, eventually becoming a professor at the Department of Romanian Language and Literature of the University of Bucharest.

During the first two decades after World War II, at least, Crohmălniceanu was known as a promoter of socialist realism, branding any kind of freedom writers dared take as being "reminiscences of bourgeois thinking" and "influenced by reactionary circles in the West." But, at the same time, he is one of those who played a major role in bringing Tudor Arghezi and Lucian Blaga back into the limelight, after they had been marginalized.
 
In his last decade in Romania, before emigrating to Germany in 1992, he supported many young writers, encouraging them to follow another path than that of communist nationalism.

He died during the night of 27 to 28 April 2000.

Books

 Cronici și articole, 1953
 Cronici literare, 1954
 Liviu Rebreanu, 1954
 Despre originalitate,1954-1956
 Despre realismul socialist, 1960
 Tudor Arghezi, 1960
 Lucian Blaga, 1960
 Istoria literaturii române între cele două războaie mondiale, 3 volumes., vol I-III, 1967-1975 
 Cinci prozatori în cinci feluri de lectură, 1984
 Literatura română și expresionismul, 1971
 Cinci prozatori în cinci feluri de lectură, 1989 
 Pâinea noastră cea de toate zilele, 1981 
 Al doilea suflu, cronici și comentarii despre fenomenul optzecist, 1989 
 Alăptat de două mame, 1992
 Amintiri deghizate, (memoirs), 1994
 Evreii în mișcarea de avangarda românească, 2002, published postumely
 Antologia poeziei franceze de la Rimbaud până azi, with Ion Caraion

Science fiction 
 Istorii însolite, 1980
 Alte istorii însolite, 1986

Translations
Vatslav Vorovsky: Studii de critică literară ("Literary Criticism Articles"), 1958 (with M. Baraz)

Awards
Romanian Writers' Union Award, 1971
Bucharest Writers' Association Award, 1980

References

1921 births
2000 deaths
People from Galați
Romanian literary critics
Romanian science fiction writers
Jewish Romanian writers
Jewish socialists
Romanian editors
Politehnica University of Bucharest alumni
Academic staff of the University of Bucharest
Romanian emigrants to Germany